The Kitzbühel Golf Alpin Open was a one-off golf tournament on the Challenge Tour played in July 2003 at Kitzbühel Schwarzsee Golf Club in Kitzbühel, Austria.

Winners

References

External links
Coverage on the Challenge Tour's official site

Former Challenge Tour events
Golf tournaments in Austria